Dollnstein is a municipality in the district of Eichstätt in Bavaria in Germany. The name Dollnstein has its origins in Middle High German "Tollunstein".

History
Dollnstein was first mentioned in 1007 as a tiny village named Tollenstein. The castle of Dollnstein was built probably in the mid of the 12th century from the counts von Hirschberg.

Since the 13th century the village was a market for the exchange of goods. From 1440 onwards the village was related to Eichstätt and an administration and judicial authority was located in Dollnstein.

Personalities

Honorary citizen 
 Ludwig Körner (1915-2012), Catholic priest

Sons and daughters of the city 
 Ludwig Ruff (1878-1934), architect
 Erich Zenger (1939-2010), Ordinarius for the Old Testament at the University of Münster
 Gisela Schneeberger (born 1948), cabaret artist and actress

References

Eichstätt (district)